A curse is a spell or incantation intended to harm.

Curse may also refer to:
 The Curse, an informal term for the Biblical expulsion of Adam and Eve and the consequent Fall of man
 A euphemism for profanity
 "The curse", a euphemism for menstruation
 curses (programming library), a programming library for Unix and Unix-like systems

as a proper name or title
 Curse (rapper) (born 1978), German rapper
 Curse (Alien Sex Fiend album), 1990
 Curse (The Legendary Pink Dots album), 1983
 "Curses", a 2004 song by Bullet for My Valentine from the EPs Bullet for My Valentine and Hand of Blood
 "Curse", a 2008 song by Cult of Luna from Eternal Kingdom
 "Curses", a 2016 song by The Crane Wives
"Curse", a song by Emily Burns 
 Curses (Vanna album), a 2007 album by Vanna
 Curses (Future of the Left album), a 2007 album by Future of the Left
 Curse (video game), a 1989 Sega Mega Drive console game
 Curses (video game), a 1993 interactive fiction computer game
 Curses!, a 1925 film directed by Fatty Arbuckle
 Curse LLC, an online video game portal and software company
 Curse (comics), a fictional villain in the comic book Spawn
 "Curses" (Space Ghost Coast to Coast), a television episode

See also
 Curse and mark of Cain,  the punishment of the first murder in the Abrahamic religions
 Curse of Turan, related to the misfortune(s) of Hungary and Hungarians
 Resource curse, the economic theory that wealth of resources slows national growth
 The Curse (disambiguation)
 Cursed (disambiguation)